The 2010 English cricket season was the 111th in which the County Championship had been an official competition. It began on 29 March with the Champion County match between Durham County Cricket Club and an MCC side, and ended on 18 September with the final of the Clydesdale Bank 40.

LV County Championship

 Pos = Position, Pld = Played, W = Wins, L = Losses, D = Draws, T = Ties, A = Abandonments, Bat = Batting points, Bowl = Bowling points, Ded = Deducted points, Pts = Points.
 Points awarded: W = 16, L = 0, D = 3, A = 3

Division One

Division Two

Clydesdale Bank 40

Knockout stage

Friends Provident t20

Knockout stage

References

External links
English Domestic Season 2010 from Cricinfo

 2010
 
2010 in cricket
Cricket season